Judge John Fine House is a historic home located at Ogdensburg in St. Lawrence County, New York.  It is a 2-story, three-bay Greek Revival-style residence appended to an earlier -story rear wing, built about 1823.  Both sections are built of local blue limestone and feature gabled roofs.

It was listed on the National Register of Historic Places in 1986.

References

Houses on the National Register of Historic Places in New York (state)
Greek Revival houses in New York (state)
Houses completed in 1823
Houses in St. Lawrence County, New York
National Register of Historic Places in St. Lawrence County, New York
1823 establishments in New York (state)